Bridges are structures built to provide a transportation route to cross above an obstacle.

Bridges may also refer to:

Places
In the United Kingdom
 Bridges Community Centre, housed in Drybridge House, Monmouth, Wales
 Bridges, Shropshire, a hamlet near Ratlinghope
 Bridges, Cornwall
 The Bridges, a shopping centre, in Sunderland, England
 The Bridges, Calgary, a development in Bridgeland, Calgary

Elsewhere
 Bridges, Queensland, a locality in Australia
 Bridges, Ohio, a community in the United States

People
 Bridges (surname)
 Bridges (cricketer, born 1780s), Homerton Cricket Club player
 Bridges (cricketer, born 1790s), Cambridge Town Club player
 Baron Bridges, a title in the Peerage of the United Kingdom
 Teddy Bridges, a fictional character in the American political drama Commander in Chief

TV and entertainment
 Bridges (puzzle)
 "Bridges", an episode in the TV drama Fairly Legal
 Bridges TV, a Muslim television channel

Music
 The Bridges (band), a U.S. rock band
 Bridges (band), a Norwegian band, predecessor to the band a-ha

Albums
 Bridges (Jets Overhead album), 2006
 Bridges (Gil Scott-Heron and Brian Jackson album), 1977
 Bridges (Moka Only album), 2012
 Bridges (Lynn Anderson album), 2015
 Bridges (Cavo album), 2016
 Bridges (John Williams album), 1979
 Bridges (Sonny Seeza album), 2016
 Bridges (Joe album), 2014
 Bridges (Josh Groban album), 2018
 Bridges (Calum Scott album), 2022
 Bridges, album by Dianne Reeves 1999
 Bridges, album by Bill Staines 1984
 Bridges, album by Mary Flower 2009

Songs
 "Bridges" (Milton Nascimento song), 1967
 "Bridges" (Broods song), 2014
 Bridges (Alika song), 2022
 "Bridges", a song by Destiny's Child from the album Destiny's Child, 1998
 "Bridges", a song by Neurosis from the album The Eye of Every Storm, 2004
 "Bridges", a song by Rise Against from the album The Black Market, 2014
 "Bridges", a song by Fifth Harmony from the album Fifth Harmony, 2017
 "Bridges", a 2012 song by Transparent

Other uses
 Bridge (dentistry), a fixed prosthesis used to replace missing teeth
 Bridge (hill), a classification of British hills
 Bridge (interpersonal), in social networks, a relationship that acts as a communication channel between different groups
 Bridge (nautical), room or platform from which a ship can be commanded
 Bridged molecules (chemistry)
 Bridges (game)

See also 
 Bridge (disambiguation)